In public transport, Route 11 may refer to:

London Buses route 11 from Liverpool Street Station to Fulham Broadway Station.
Melbourne tram route 11, running from West Preston in Melbourne's north to Victoria Harbour Docklands.
Route 11 (MTA Maryland), a bus route in Baltimore, Maryland and its suburbs.
SEPTA Route 11, a streetcar in Philadelphia, Pennsylvania and its suburbs.
West Midlands bus route 11, actually numbered 11A (anticlockwise), 11C (clockwise), and 11E (shortened journeys).

(To take) bus 11 is also slang for walking in various languages (representing the two feet), including English and Chinese.

11